Bothriospilini is a tribe of beetles in the subfamily Cerambycinae. The tribe was proposed in 1950 by Brazilian entomologist Frederico Lane as a member of the new subfamily Bothriospilinae, and with Bothriospila assigned as the type genus. The tribe is morphologically close to the tribe Torneutini, with which it has in common the same shape of the last abdominal segment, which is wide and largely braided in the female, as well as the anterior thigh cavities that are open from behind and the laterally open medial cavity.

Bothriospilini contains 11 genera, which have a primarily neotropical distribution:

 Bothriospila – 2 spp.
 Chlorida – 10 spp.
 Chrotoma – 1 sp.
 Delemodacrys – 1 sp.
 Gnaphalodes – 1 sp.
 Knulliana – 1 sp.
 Pseudeburia – 1 sp.
 Ranqueles – 3 ssp.
 Scapanopygus – 1 sp.
 Taygayba – 1 sp.
 Timbaraba – 1 sp.

The compound (6E,8Z)-6,8-pentadecadienal, produced by adult males of Chlorida festiva and Chlorida costata, was the first pheromone identified from species in Bothriospilini. The sex pheromone methionol (3-methylthiopropan-1-ol), as well as the corresponding sulfoxide, 3-methylsulfinylpropan-1-ol, produced by Knulliana cincta, was identified in 2022.

References

 
Polyphaga tribes
Taxa described in 1950